Municipal voting for mayors in Russia took place on 14 October 2012, some regional governors (in five provinces) have been elected.

According to the preliminary results published on October, 15, President Vladimir Putin's loyalists won in most local election races, however, some observers (i.e. the GOLOS Association) claimed the vote was falsified and reported multiple violations nationwide.

According to the President Putin, the elections were "a serious step toward strengthening Russian statehood and created the conditions for energetic, effective development."

See also 
2011 Russian legislative election

References

External links 
Opposition aims for headway in Russian local vote (yahoo.com)
Russian local elections test Putin's grip (yahoo.com)

Regional elections in Russia
2012 elections in Russia
October 2012 events in Russia